The Crooked Trees, Crooked Bush, Twisted Trees or the Crooked Trees of Alticane are a grove of deformed trembling aspen trees of type Populus tremuloides Michx. found in Saskatchewan, Canada. They are found approximately twenty kilometers north-north-west of the town of Hafford, Saskatchewan and just over five kilometers south-west of Alticane.

The trees, prominent in Saskatchewan folklore, are dramatically different from the un-twisted aspens just across the road. Explanations have been offered which include various paranormal factors. However, cuttings from these trees, propagated in Manitoba, exhibit the same pattern of twisted growth, suggesting that the cause is rooted in genetics, possibly the result of a mutation.

The trees' unusual appearance was noticed in the 1940s and has attracted the attention of tourists for decades, but more so since the proliferation of websites and blogs that mention them. A wooden walkway was constructed through the grove to keep visitors from trampling any new growth.

Because the deformity is likely genetic and aspens propagate by root suckers, it is likely that all the crooked trees in the grove are clones that originated from a single mutated tree. The grove is currently bounded on all sides by the grid road and a perimeter access road, so the size of the grove is static and is unlikely to continue spreading.

The grove can be seen in the Disney true life adventure/fantasy film Perri (1957).

References

External links
 

Canadian folklore
Culture of Saskatchewan
Douglas No. 436, Saskatchewan
Division No. 16, Saskatchewan